Bherchha is a village and former Rajput jagir (feudal estate) in Nagda Tehsil, Ujjain district, in the state of Madhya Pradesh, India.

Berchha is famous for the Nag Maharaj temple. Every month Panchami is celebrated here.

References

Jagirs
Princely states of Madhya Pradesh
Rajput princely states